Hamlet is a tragic play by William Shakespeare, based in the story of Jute prince Amleth.

Hamlet may also refer to:

Pertaining to Shakespeare play
 Prince Hamlet, the protagonist

Film 
 Hamlet (1900 film) or Le Duel d'Hamlet, starring Sarah Bernhardt in the title role
 Hamlet (1907 film), a French silent film, with Georges Méliès in the title role
 Hamlet (1908 film), a French silent film
 Hamlet (1912 film), a British silent film
 Hamlet (1913 film), a British silent film
 Hamlet (1917 film), an Italian silent film
 Hamlet: The Drama of Vengeance, a 1921 German silent film
 Hamlet (1948 film), a British film, with Laurence Olivier in the title role
 Hamlet (1959 film), an Australian television play
 Hamlet (1961 film), a German film, with Maximilian Schell in the title role
 Hamlet (1964 film), a Soviet film, with Innokenty Smoktunovsky in the title role
 Richard Burton's Hamlet, a 1964 Broadway production with Richard Burton in the title role, filmed for theatrical release
 Hamlet (1969 film), a British film, with Nicol Williamson in the title role
 Hamlet (1990 film), an American/British/French film, with Mel Gibson in the title role
 Hamlet (1996 film) or William Shakespeare's Hamlet, a 1996 British/American film with Kenneth Branagh in the title role
 Hamlet (2000 film), an American film, with Ethan Hawke in the title role
 Hamlet (2009 film), a BBC television film

Music 
 Hamlet (band), a Spanish heavy metal band
 Hamlet (album)
 Hamlet (Thomas), a French opera by Ambroise Thomas
 Hamlet, German opera by Anno Schreier 2006 
 Hamlet (Dean), a 2017 English opera by Brett Dean
 Hamlet (Tchaikovsky), two compositions
 Hamlet (Liszt), a symphonic poem by Franz Liszt

Other 
 Hamlet (video game)

Places
 Hamlet (place), a generic name for a small settlement

In the United States
 Hamlet, California
 Hamlet, Illinois
 Hamlet, Indiana 
 Hamlet, Nebraska
 Hamlet, New York
 Hamlet, North Carolina
 Hamlet, Ohio
 Hamlet, Oregon
 Hamlet (Oregon), a form of local government
 Hamlet, West Virginia

Elsewhere
 Hamlet, Alberta, a community in Canada
 The Hamlets, Liverpool, England
 Hamlet (crater), a crater on Oberon, one of Uranus's moons

Other uses 
 Hamlet (name)
 Hamlet (cigar), brand produced by Japan Tobacco
 Hamlet (fish), a fish of the genus Hypoplectrus
 HAMLET (protein complex)
 FIM-43 Redeye, a surface-to-air missile system, known as "Hamlet" in the Danish service 
 The Hamlet, a novel by William Faulkner
 Hamlet, a character in the comic strip Hägar the Horrible
 "Hamlet (Pow Pow Pow)", a song from the 1982 album Junkyard by The Birthday Party
 Hamlet chicken processing plant fire, 1991, North Carolina, United States

See also
 Hamlett, a surname